Shelter Island meteorite was found on Mars by the Opportunity rover on October 1, 2009.

History
Shelter Island was the second of three iron meteorites encountered by the rover on Meridiani Planum within a few hundred meters, the others being Block Island and Mackinac Island.

Shelter Island may have fallen on Mars in the late Noachian period and is extensively weathered.

See also

 Atmospheric reentry
 Bounce Rock
 Glossary of meteoritics
 Heat Shield Rock
 List of Martian meteorites
 List of meteorites on Mars
 Oileán Ruaidh meteorite
List of surface features of Mars imaged by Opportunity

References

Meteorites found on Mars
Rocks on Mars